"Susan" is a song by The Buckinghams, released as a single in 1967, and on their album Portraits in 1968. It spent 12 weeks on the Billboard Hot 100 chart, peaking at No. 11, while reaching No. 7 on Canada's RPM 100, No. 2 on Canada's CHUM Hit Parade, No. 2 in the Philippines, and No. 18 on New Zealand's NZ Listener chart.

The song contains a short excerpt of Charles Ives' composition, Central Park in the Dark, which contrasts sharply with the sunshine pop flavor of the majority of the track. The section containing this excerpt was added by producer James William Guercio, and the group disliked it when they heard it. This section was edited out by many radio stations when they aired the song.

Chart performance

Weekly charts

Year-end charts

References

External links
 

1967 songs
1967 singles
The Buckinghams songs
Songs written by Gary Beisbier
Songs written by Jim Holvay
Columbia Records singles
Song recordings produced by James William Guercio